The MV Cartela is an excursion vessel operating on the Derwent River in Hobart, Tasmania, Australia. She is now Australia's oldest continuously-licensed passenger vessel, although there are several older vessels still in service that have been restored after lengthy periods in dereliction.

History
The Cartela (the Tasmanian Aboriginal name for a bull seal) was built in 1912 at Battery Point, Hobart, by Purdon & Featherstone for the Huon Channel and Peninsula Steamship Company Pty. Ltd. She was designed to operate as a cargo and passenger vessel in the coastal and riverine trades south and south-east of the city. The Cartela was primarily constructed to replace an earlier vessel, the Awittaka, that had recently been sold to the Solomon Islands Government, and she was specially designed to be the fastest vessel in the premier excursion trade.  That was achieved by fitting the vessel with a powerful triple-expansion steam engine, and a large-capacity boiler that allowed lengthy periods of operation at maximum speed without losing pressure - a problem faced by both her predecessor and her chief rival the  SS Togo. Cartela and Togo regularly competed in an unofficial race held on Christmas Day until 1931, and both won five races each. In 1926, the two vessels collided off Battery Point and the Togo was forced aground.  Because the vessels had passed out of state-controlled harbour waters into federally-controlled coastal waters during the course of the race, a Royal Commission was held into whether the Marine Board of Hobart was entitled to hold an inquiry.

At the outbreak of World War I, Cartela was leased by the Royal Australian Navy for use as an examination vessel. protecting the port of Hobart.  Most of Cartela'''s service until after World War II involved operating passenger and cargo services between Hobart, the Tasman Peninsula, and ports on the D'Entrecasteaux Channel, with a proportion of excursion activities up and down the River Derwent. She occasionally performed other duties, including  a voyage to Melbourne during a seamen's strike in 1919, and acting as a tug, before dedicated tug-boats were employed in Hobart after World War II. One significant tow was the rescue of the dismasted barque Inverness-shire, a vessel more than ten times her size, from Storm Bay to Hobart in 1915. A legal case arising from that event is still occasionally cited as a reference regarding the legal distinction between "towage" and "salvage".

Improved road services connecting outlying regions of south-eastern Tasmania brought an end to commercial river steamer services, so by the 1950s, the vessel was almost exclusively engaged in excursion work around Hobart for new owners Roche Brothers Pty. Ltd. In 1958, Cartela was extensively altered, being converted from a steamship to a motor vessel. In 1975, following the Tasman Bridge disaster, she was fitted with more powerful engines for use as a ferry.

Cartela is now owned by the SteamShip Cartela Trust on behalf of the Tasmanian people. In recognition of her being one of the very few timber vessels that has remained in continuous commercial service for a century, in 2016 it was announced that she would undergo a complete renovation and be returned to steam power. That would including the refurbishment of the original Plenty & Sons steam engine.

Engines
First Engine
Cartela's first engine was a reciprocating triple-expansion steam engine built by Plenty and Sons, Newbury, England. It had three cylinders, powering a four-bladed propeller  in diameter. . The engine was used from 1912 to 1958.

Second Engine
The engine was used until 1975.

Third Engine
Cartela's third engine was installed to give her the speed provided by her original steam engine. It was a 6-cylinder turbocharged Caterpillar diesel engine, producing  (@ 1800RPM). Fuel tank capacity was 1800 litres.

References

Further reading
George Cox, Ships in Tasmanian Waters, 1971
John Duffy and Louis Rodway, The Cock of the River "Cartela"'', 1996

External links
Cartela Trust website owners of the M.V. Cartela

Ferries of Tasmania
1912 ships
Ships of Australia